Gerd Nagel (born 22 October 1957 in Sulingen, Lower Saxony) is a retired West German high jumper.

Biography
He won the 1979 University Games and finished fourteenth at the 1987 World Championships. At the European Indoor Championships he won the silver in 1983 and a bronze in 1990, and finished fourth in 1982 and thirteenth in 1988.

He represented the sports team LG Frankfurt and became West German champion in 1979.

His personal best jump was 2.35 metres, achieved in August 1988 in Forbach. This result ranks him fifth among German high jumpers, behind Carlo Thränhardt, Gerd Wessig, Dietmar Mögenburg and Martin Buß. He had a better indoor jump with 2.36 metres, achieved in March 1989 in Sulingen. The Internationales Hochsprung-Meeting Eberstadt in June 1979, when Nagel, Thränhardt and Mögenburg improved the West German record from 2.26 m to 2.30 m, marked the first time three jumpers had cleared this height in the same competition.

References

External links
 
 
 

1957 births
Living people
People from Sulingen
West German male high jumpers
Athletes (track and field) at the 1984 Summer Olympics
Olympic athletes of West Germany
World Athletics Championships athletes for West Germany
European Athletics Championships medalists
Universiade medalists in athletics (track and field)
Universiade gold medalists for West Germany
Medalists at the 1979 Summer Universiade
Medalists at the 1981 Summer Universiade
Sportspeople from Lower Saxony